The 29th Logistics Battalion is a logistics battalion in the Land Component of the Belgian Armed Forces. tasked with the storage and distribution of ammunition, fuel, Stores and providing maintenance and disposal services  for the Belgian Armed Forces

Organisation
29th Logistics Battalion comprises:
 HQ staff
 10 Fuel and Heavy Transport company
 101 Supply and Service company 
 230 Equipment company 
 260 Ammunition company

Logistics Battalion, 29
Military logistics of Belgium
Military units and formations established in 1971
Grobbendonk